Július Korostelev (19 June 1923 – 18 October 2006) was a Czechoslovak football player and manager born in Turčiansky Svätý Martin (in modern-day Slovakia) who played as a midfielder. Although Korostelev started his career with SK Bratislava, he played the majority of his football in Italy, with clubs such as Juventus, Atalanta, Reggina and Parma.

For a brief time in 1961, Korostelev returned to Juventus as a manager, however only for the first two matches of the season before Carlo Parola returned.

References

External links
Mention of Július Korostelev's death

1923 births
2006 deaths
Sportspeople from Martin, Slovakia
Slovak footballers
Czechoslovak expatriate footballers
Slovak football managers
Czechoslovak footballers
Czechoslovak football managers
Juventus F.C. players
Atalanta B.C. players
Reggina 1914 players
Parma Calcio 1913 players
Serie A players
Serie B players
Expatriate footballers in Italy
Czechoslovakia international footballers
ŠK Slovan Bratislava players
Czechoslovak expatriate sportspeople in Italy
Association football midfielders